Potassium perchlorate is the inorganic salt with the chemical formula KClO4.  Like other perchlorates, this salt is a strong oxidizer although it usually reacts very slowly with organic substances.  This, usually obtained as a colorless, crystalline solid, is a common oxidizer used in fireworks, ammunition percussion caps, explosive primers, and is used variously in propellants, flash compositions, stars, and sparklers.  It has been used as a solid rocket propellant, although in that application it has mostly been replaced by the higher performance ammonium perchlorate.

Production

Potassium perchlorate is prepared industrially by treating an aqueous solution of sodium perchlorate with potassium chloride.  This single precipitation reaction exploits the low solubility of KClO4, which is about 1/100 as much as the solubility of NaClO4 (209.6 g/100 mL at 25 °C).

It can also be produced by bubbling chlorine gas through a solution of potassium chlorate and potassium hydroxide, and by the reaction of perchloric acid with potassium hydroxide; however, this is not used widely due to the dangers of perchloric acid.

Another preparation involves the electrolysis of a potassium chlorate solution, causing KClO4 to form and precipitate at the anode. This procedure is complicated by the low solubility of both potassium chlorate and potassium perchlorate, the latter of which may precipitate onto the electrodes and impede the current.

Oxidizing properties
KClO4 is an oxidizer in the sense that it exothermically transfers oxygen to combustible materials, greatly increasing their rate of combustion relative to that in air. Thus, with glucose it gives carbon dioxide:
3 KClO4  +  C6H12O6   →   6 H2O  +  6 CO2  +  3 KCl

The conversion of solid glucose into hot gaseous CO2 is the basis of the explosive force of this and other such mixtures. With sugar, KClO4 yields a low explosive, provided the necessary confinement. Otherwise such mixtures simply deflagrate with an intense purple flame characteristic of potassium. Flash compositions used in firecrackers usually consist of a mixture of aluminium powder and potassium perchlorate. This mixture, sometimes called flash powder, is also used in ground and air fireworks.

As an oxidizer, potassium perchlorate can be used safely in the presence of sulfur, whereas potassium chlorate cannot. The greater reactivity of chlorate is typical – perchlorates are kinetically poorer oxidants. Chlorate produces chloric acid, which is highly unstable and can lead to premature ignition of the composition. Correspondingly, perchloric acid is quite stable.

In commercial use it is mixed 50/50 with potassium nitrate to create Pyrodex black powder substitute, and when not compressed within a muzzle loading firearm or in a cartridge, burns at a sufficiently slow rate to reduce it from being categorized with black powder as a low explosive, to "flammable".

Medicine use
Potassium perchlorate can be used as an antithyroid agent used to treat hyperthyroidism, usually in combination with one other medication.  This application exploits the similar ionic radius and hydrophilicity of perchlorate and iodide.

The administration of known goitrogen substances can also be used as a prevention in reducing the bio-uptake of iodine, (whether it be the nutritional non-radioactive iodine-127 or radioactive iodine, radioiodine - most commonly iodine-131, as the body cannot discern between different iodine isotopes).
perchlorate ions, a common water contaminant in the USA due to the aerospace industry, has been shown to reduce iodine uptake and thus is classified as a goitrogen. Perchlorate ions are a competitive inhibitor of the process by which iodide, is actively deposited into thyroid follicular cells. Studies involving healthy adult volunteers determined that at levels above 0.007 milligrams per kilogram per day (mg/(kg·d)), perchlorate begins to temporarily inhibit the thyroid gland's ability to absorb iodine from the bloodstream ("iodide uptake inhibition", thus perchlorate is a known goitrogen).
The reduction of the iodide pool by perchlorate has dual effects – reduction of excess hormone synthesis and hyperthyroidism, on the one hand, and reduction of thyroid inhibitor synthesis and hypothyroidism on the other. Perchlorate remains very useful as a single dose application in tests measuring the discharge of radioiodide accumulated in the thyroid as a result of many different disruptions in the further metabolism of iodide in the thyroid gland.

Treatment of thyrotoxicosis (including Graves' disease) with 600-2,000 mg potassium perchlorate (430-1,400 mg perchlorate) daily for periods of several months or longer was once common practice, particularly in Europe, and perchlorate use at lower doses to treat thyroid problems continues to this day. Although 400 mg of potassium perchlorate divided into four or five daily doses was used initially and found effective, higher doses were introduced when 400 mg/d was discovered not to control thyrotoxicosis in all subjects.

Current regimens for treatment of thyrotoxicosis (including Graves' disease), when a patient is exposed to additional sources of Iodine, commonly include 500 mg potassium perchlorate twice per day for 18–40 days.

Prophylaxis with perchlorate containing water at concentrations of 17 ppm, which corresponds to 0.5 mg/(kg d) personal intake, if one is 70 kg and consumes 2 litres of water per day, was found to reduce baseline radioiodine uptake by 67% This is equivalent to ingesting a total of just 35 mg of Perchlorate ions per day. In another related study were subjects drank just 1 litre of perchlorate containing water per day at a concentration of 10 ppm, i.e. daily 10 mg of Perchlorate ions  were ingested, an average 38% reduction in the uptake of Iodine was observed.

However, when the average perchlorate absorption in perchlorate plant workers subjected to the highest exposure has been estimated as approximately 0.5 mg/(kg d), as in the above paragraph, a 67% reduction of iodine uptake would be expected. Studies of chronically exposed workers though have thus far failed to detect any abnormalities of thyroid function, including the uptake of iodine. this may well be attributable to sufficient daily exposure or intake of healthy Iodine-127 among the workers and the short 8 hr Biological half life of Perchlorate in the body.

To completely block the uptake of Iodine-131 by the purposeful addition of perchlorate ions to a populace's water supply, aiming at dosages of 0.5 mg/(kg d), or a water concentration of 17 ppm, would therefore be grossly inadequate at truly reducing radioiodine uptake. Perchlorate ion concentrations in a regions water supply, would need to be much higher, at least 7.15 mg/kg of body weight per day or a water concentration of 250 ppm, assuming people drink 2 liters of water per day, to be truly beneficial to the population at preventing bioaccumulation when exposed to a radioiodine environment, independent of the availability of Iodate or Iodide drugs.

The continual distribution of perchlorate tablets or the addition of perchlorate to the water supply would need to continue for no less than 80–90 days, beginning immediately after the initial release of radioiodine was detected, after 80–90 days had passed released radioactive iodine-131 would have decayed to less than 0.1% of its initial quantity at which time the danger from biouptake of iodine-131 is essentially over.

References

External links

 WebBook page for KClO4

Potassium compounds
Perchlorates
Pyrotechnic oxidizers